The 1925 VPI Gobblers football team was an American football team that represented Virginia Polytechnic Institute as a member of the Southern Conference during the 1925 season.  In its fifth season under head coach B. C. Cubbage, VPI compiled a 5–3–2 record (3–3–1 against conference opponents), finished in tenth place in the Southern Conference, and was outscored by a total of 52 to 39.  The team played its home games at Miles Field in Blacksburg, Virginia.

Schedule

Players
The following players were members of the 1925 football team according to the roster published in the 1926 edition of The Bugle, the Virginia Tech yearbook.

References

VPI
Virginia Tech Hokies football seasons
VPI Gobblers football